Hailey Abbott is an American author of teenage romance novels. She grew up in southern California where she split her time between creative writing and the beach. She now lives in New York City.

Her first book was Summer Boys, published in 2004, the first of a series. It was described as "escapist beach reading" by the School Library Journal.

Works

Summer Boys Series 

 Summer Boys June 1, 2004
 Next Summer June 1, 2005
 the After Summer September 1, 2006
 Last Summer May 1, 2007

Summer Girls Series 

 Summer Girls May 2009
 Girls in Love  May 2010

Other books 

 The Bridesmaid May 24, 2005
 The Secrets of Boys May 30, 2006
 Getting Lost with Boys June 12, 2007
 The Perfect Boy April 24, 2007
 Waking Up to Boys May 29, 2007
 Forbidden Boy April 22, 2008
 The Other Boy May 27, 2008
 Boy Crazy April 28, 2009
 Flirting With Boys April 28, 2009

References

American women novelists
American romantic fiction novelists
Living people
21st-century American novelists
Women romantic fiction writers
21st-century American women writers
Year of birth missing (living people)